The Maldon Football and Netball Club is an Australian rules football club that plays in the Maryborough Castlemaine District Football League and is situated in the township of Maldon, Victoria, in the central Victorian goldfields. The clubs plays its home games at Bill Woodfull Oval, Maldon. The club's nickname is known as the Bombers.

History 
The club was established in 1873. The club played in the Castlemaine District Football Association from 1894 to 1951. The club won its first premiership in 1894 and then dominated the competition. It lost only one match between 1898 and 1902. Between 1927 and 1933 the club was known as Tarrengower. Between 1965 and 1979 the club 15 seasons in the Golden City Football League. It made the finals on four occasions bet lost every finals match it played.

Premierships

Castlemaine District Football Association 
 1894, 1896, 1898, 1899, 1900, 1901, 1902, 1904, 1905, 1906, 1908, 1909, 1914, 1920, 1923

Castlemaine District Football League 
 1927, 1929, 1931, 1949, 1950, 1951

Maryborough Castlemaine District Football League 
 1952, 1955, 1956, 1957, 1983, 1985, 1987, 1988, 2010

League Best and Fairest
1981 Glen Roy 
1983 Ken Patton
2015 Hayden Kelly
2021 Tommy Horne

Leading Goalkickers 
1982 Russell Emmens 90
1984 Russell Emmens 90
1987 Darren Rice 100
1988 Darren Rice 121
1988 Darren Rice 138
1991 Darren Rice 109
1999 Michael Howell 83
2011 Christian Kelly 121

Books
History of Football in the Bendigo District - John Stoward -

References

Australian rules football clubs in Victoria (Australia)
Netball teams in Victoria (Australia)
Australian rules football clubs established in 1873
1873 establishments in Australia